Princess Margaret Blvd. is a 2008 Canadian drama short film, directed by Kazik Radwanski. Made as a class project by Radwanski and producer Daniel Montgomery for their final year of film studies at Ryerson University, the film stars Gina Sylvester as Isabelle Rodarte, a woman coming to terms with her diagnosis with Alzheimer's disease.

The film was named to the Toronto International Film Festival's year-end Canada's Top Ten list for 2008, and received a Genie Award nomination for Best Live Action Short Drama at the 30th Genie Awards.

References

External links
 

2008 films
Films directed by Kazik Radwanski
Films about Alzheimer's disease
2000s English-language films
Canadian drama short films
2000s Canadian films